Portbou is a railway station serving Portbou in Catalonia, Spain. It is on the Barcelona–Cerbère railway and the Narbonne–Portbou railway. The station is owned by Adif and is served by Rodalies de Catalunya regional line  and Girona commuter rail service line  and TER Occitanie trains also serve the station.

Between Portbou railway station and Cerbère railway station in France, both track gauges run through the Balitres tunnel.

References

External links
 Portbou listing at Adif website
 Portbou listing at Rodalies de Catalunya website
 Information and photos of the station at trenscat.cat 
 Information on the dual-gauge rail link with France

Railway stations in Catalonia
Railway stations in Spain opened in 1878
Rodalies de Catalunya stations
Transport in Alt Empordà